The Bernard Zell Anshe Emet Day School (Bernard Zell) is a private primary Jewish day school located in the community of Lake View, in Chicago, Illinois. It educates from nursery school through eighth grade.  The school is accredited by the National Association of Independent Schools and the Independent Schools Association of the Central States. It is a Blue Ribbon School, the highest award an American school can receive.

History
In 1940, Rabbi Solomon Goldman of Anshe Emet Synagogue envisioned a progressive independent Jewish day school. Anshe Emet Day School opened on September 16, 1946, with 31 students and a curriculum combining general education with Jewish values and culture, as well as Hebrew language. The school was renamed Bernard Zell Anshe Emet Day School in 1988.

Mission
"You Shall Teach Them Diligently" - ושננתם לבניך

The Bernard Zell is an independent Jewish Day School for the 21st century where academic purpose, collaborative learning and a deep commitment to humanity develop engaged, confident learners and compassionate leaders for a stronger, more vibrant community and world.

Academics
The school became a Blue Ribbon School in 1987–88. The school starts foreign language studies for students at the age of 3.

Notable alumni
 Rahm Emanuel, Chicago Mayor, former Congressman, White House Chief of Staff (Obama), and staffer (Clinton)
 Scott Simon, journalist and the host of Weekend Edition Saturday on National Public Radio.
 Dean Baker, economist, director of CEPR
 Ike Barinholtz, actor and comedian
 Yonit Levi, Israeli news anchor
 Zoe Levin, actress

See also
 History of the Jews in Chicago

References

External links
 Official site

Conservative Judaism in Illinois
Educational institutions established in 1946
Jewish day schools in Chicago
Private elementary schools in Illinois
Private middle schools in Illinois
1946 establishments in Illinois